Alex Duncan Hartridge (born 9 March 1999) is an English professional footballer who plays for  club Exeter City as a defender.

Career
Born in Torquay, Hartridge began his career with Exeter City, turning professional in April 2017. He spent five loan spells on loan at Truro City.

He made his senior debut for Exeter City on 28 November 2017, in the EFL Cup. He made his Football League debut for them on 29 December 2018.

On 12 July 2019, Hartridge signed a six-month loan deal with National League South side Bath City. In mid-November, he was recalled due to Exeter's injury crisis. Hartridge sat on the bench for one game, before he headed back to Bath City. However, he was recalled once again on 3 January 2020 to be involved in Exeter's weekend fixture. On 9 January 2020, he headed back to Bath City for the third team, the club confirmed, for the rest of the season.

He scored his first goal for Exeter in an EFL Trophy tie against Swindon Town on 6 October 2020.

Career statistics

Honours
Exeter City
League Two runner-up: 2021–22

References

External links
Profile at the Exeter City F.C. website

1999 births
Living people
English footballers
Association football defenders
Exeter City F.C. players
Truro City F.C. players
National League (English football) players
English Football League players
Bath City F.C. players